Knud Andersen (11 April 1917 – 7 April 2003) was a Danish footballer. He played in three matches for the Denmark national football team in 1937.

References

External links
 

1917 births
2003 deaths
Danish men's footballers
Denmark international footballers
Association football forwards
Boldklubben 1903 players